I is the seventh studio album by Japanese singer Juju. It was released on February 21, 2018, through Onenation. "I" became Juju's first solo number-one album on the Oricon Albums Chart.

Background
I is Juju's first album in nearly a year and a half, since Snack Juju: Yoru no Request, and first studio album in over two years, since What You Want. The first pressing of the album includes a DVD featuring eight performances from Juju's Juju-en Special: Snack Juju Arena Tour 2017 concert held at Yokohama Arena on July 11, 2017. On November 6, 2017, Juju will announced she will be embarking on the Juju Hall Tour 2018 "I" in support of the album. The tour is set to commence on April 22, 2018 at the Mori no Hall 21 in Matsudo, Chiba.

Commercial performance
I entered the daily Oricon Albums Chart at the number-one spot, selling 12,000 units sold. It debuted at the top of the weekly chart as well, logging sales of 29,000  copies. The album also debuted at number one on the Billboard Japan Top Albums Sales chart, and at number 2 on the Billboard Japan Hot Albums chart, where it missed out on the top spot to The Greatest Showman: Original Motion Picture Soundtrack.

Track listing

Charts

Sales

References

External links
 New Album I Special Page

2018 albums
Juju (singer) albums
Onenation albums
Albums produced by her0ism